Bobby Berna (born May 19, 1961 in the Philippines) is a retired Filipino boxer.

Professional career

After turning professional in 1979 he had compiled a record of 23-2-1 in 4 years before travelling to Los Angeles in 1983 to challenge Jaime Garza for the vacant WBC super bantamweight title. He was stopped by Garza in the second round and missed out on the opportunity to become champion. He rebounded by beating Suh Sung-in for the newly created IBF's inaugural super bantamweight championship. He would lose the title in his first defense in a rematch to Suh four months later. He would have his final title shot against Kim Ji-Won but would be unsuccessful, he would end up retiring from he sport in 1988.

See also 
List of super-bantamweight boxing champions
List of Filipino boxing world champions

References

External links

1961 births
Living people
Bantamweight boxers
Super-bantamweight boxers
World super-bantamweight boxing champions
International Boxing Federation champions
Filipino male boxers
Sportspeople from Quezon City